Eupithecia electreofasciata is a moth in the family Geometridae. It was described by David Stephen Fletcher in 1958 and it is found in Uganda.

References

Moths described in 1958
electreofasciata
Moths of Africa